On the Wires of Our Nerves is the second studio album by English electronic music band Add N to (X), released in 1998 by Soul Jazz Records subsidiary label Satellite Records in the UK and Mute Records in North America.  Soul Jazz reissued it as a limited edition silver vinyl double LP in 2021.

Track listing

"Nevermind" is a bonus track on the Satellite CD and the Soul Jazz reissue double LP.
Sample credits
"King Wasp" contains elements from "I'm a King Bee", performed by Slim Harpo.

Personnel
Add N to (X)
Steven Claydon
Ann Shenton
Barry Smith

Additional musicians
Rob Allum
Dean Honer – additional keyboards

Production
Add N to (X) – production, engineering
Dean Honer – production, engineering

Artwork and design
Simon Perriton – photography
Adrian Self – design
Sparky Hydrofoil – design

References

Add N to (X) albums
1998 albums
Mute Records albums